The 31st Venice Biennale, held in 1962, was an exhibition of international contemporary art, with 33 participating nations. The Venice Biennale takes place biennially in Venice, Italy. Winners of the Gran Premi (Grand Prize) included French painter Alfred Manessier, Swiss sculptor Alberto Giacometti, Argentine etcher Antonio Berni, and Italians painter Giuseppe Gapogrossi ex aequo with Ennio Morlotti, sculptor Aldo Calò ex aequo with Umberto Milani, and etcher Antonino Virduzzo.

References

Bibliography

Further reading 

 
 
 
 
 
 
 
 
 
 
 
 
 
 
 
 
 
 
 

1962 in art
1962 in Italy
Venice Biennale exhibitions